The Foothill Conference was a college athletic conference that is affiliated with the California Community College Athletic Association. Several community colleges were members until it was formally disbanded in Spring, 2016.

History
The Foothill Conference was formed in 1988. However, the roots of the conference can be traced to 1981 when the football-only Foothill Conference was formed.

The Foothill Conference was an offshoot of the Southern California Conference, which included many of the Los Angeles-based community colleges. Founding members of the Foothill Conference were Antelope Valley, Citrus, Chaffey, Desert, East Los Angeles, Mt. San Jacinto, Rio Hondo, San Bernardino Valley and Victor Valley colleges.

Two colleges, East Los Angeles College and Citrus College, eventually left the conference. Barstow College and Cerro Coso Community College joined later as full-time participants.

In Fall 2013, Mt. San Jacinto and Antelope Valley were hosted into other athletic conferences. Mt. San Jacinto was accepted as a member of the Pacific Coast Conference while Antelope Valley moved to the Western State Conference South Division.

The departure of Mt. San Jacinto and Antelope Valley made the Conference the smallest in the state, eventually leading to is demise.

Members
 Barstow College Vikings
 Cerro Coso College Coyotes
 Chaffey College Panthers
 College of the Desert Roadrunners
 Rio Hondo College Roadrunners
 San Bernardino Valley College Wolverines
 Victor Valley College Rams

Past members

References

External links
 COA - Commission on Athletics - Foothill Conference
 Official website
 Foothill Conference statistics

CCCAA conferences